Kyratso (Karrie) G. Karahalios is an American computer scientist and professor in the Department of Computer Science, University of Illinois at Urbana-Champaign. She is noted for her work on the impact of computer science on people and society, analyses of social media, and algorithm auditing. She is co-founder of the Center for People and Infrastructures at the University of Illinois at Urbana-Champaign.

Education
She received her bachelor's degree at MIT in EECS in 1994,  ME in EECS in 1995, S.M. in Media Arts and Sciences in 1997, and a PhD in Media Arts and Sciences in 2004.

Career and research
Karahalios joined the Department of Computer Science at the University of Illinois at Urbana-Champaign in 2004 as an assistant professor and received tenure in 2010. In 2017 she was promoted to full professor.  Her research focuses on social media and the impact of computing on society, including algorithmic bias and methods to detect and analyze such bias, a field termed "algorithm auditing". Her 2014 paper on auditing algorithms provided research methods for detecting discrimination on internet platforms has been cited more than 200 times.
Her most cited paper provides a model for predicting "tie strength" in social media, and has been cited more than 1500 times according to Google Scholar.

ACLU suit
In 2016, the American Civil Liberties Union filed a suit on behalf of Karahalios and several other plaintiffs against Loretta Lynch, in her official capacity as Attorney General of the United States, challenging "the constitutionality of a provision of the Computer Fraud and Abuse Act (“CFAA”), 18 U.S.C. § 1030 et seq., a federal statute that prohibits and chills academics, researchers, and journalists from testing for discrimination on the internet". The federal government argued against the suit, but in April 2018, a federal judge ruled that it should  be permitted to continue.

Awards and honors
Karahalios was one of the recipients of the National Science Foundation CAREER Awards in 2007, of the A. Richard Newton Breakthrough Research Award in 2008, and of the Alfred P. Sloan Fellowships in 2010.  She was named a University Scholar at the University of Illinois in 2019. She has received Best Paper awards for publications in the Conference on Human Factors in Computing Systems (CHI) in 2008, 2009, 2015, and 2017

References 

MIT School of Engineering alumni
University of Illinois Urbana-Champaign faculty
Sloan Fellows
American women computer scientists
American computer scientists
Greek emigrants to the United States
Year of birth missing (living people)
Living people
21st-century American women